Sarah Yuan is an American medical researcher, and Deriso Endowed Chair at University of South Florida. She was named a 2019 Fellow of the American Association for the Advancement of Science.  She was named Outstanding Investigator Award , by the National Heart, Lung, and Blood Institute.

Life 
She graduated from First Military Medical University, and Second Military Medical University. She teaches at University of South Florida.

References 

Fellows of the American Association for the Advancement of Science
Year of birth missing (living people)
Living people